Panayiotis Jerasimof Vatikiotis (5 February 192815 December 1997) was a Greek-American political scientist and historian of the Middle East. He was Professor of Politics at the School of Oriental and African Studies, in London.

Vatikiotis was born in Jerusalem, the son of Paraskevi and Jerasimos Vatikiotis, and grew up in Haifa. He was educated at Greek and English private schools in Mandatory Palestine before he studied at the American University in Cairo and Johns Hopkins University. In the 1960s he moved to London University where he helped get Middle Eastern Studies established.

A festschrift was published in his honour in 1993.

Works
 The Egyptian Army in politics; pattern for new nations?, 1961
 Politics and the military in Jordan : a study of the Arab Legion, 1921-1957, 1967
 Egypt since the revolution, 1968
 The modern history of Egypt, 1969. 2nd ed published as The history of Egypt, 1980.
 Conflict in the Middle East, 1971
 (ed.) Revolution in the Middle East, and other case studies, 1972
 Nasser and his generation, 1978
 The modern history of Egypt, 1986. Rev. ed. published as The history of modern Egypt: from Muhammad Ali to Mubarak, 1991

Among Arabs and Jews: A Personal Experience 1936-1990, 1991
''Popular Autocracy in Greece 1936-1941

References

1928 births
1997 deaths
Historians of the Middle East
American political scientists
American people of Greek descent
People from Jerusalem
20th-century American historians
American male non-fiction writers
Mandatory Palestine emigrants to the United States
Johns Hopkins University alumni
American expatriates in the United Kingdom
20th-century American male writers
20th-century political scientists